Sailendu Nath Phukan (1 April 1937 – 11 November 2018) or S. N. Phukan was an Indian judge and former judge of the Supreme Court of India.

Career
After passing LL.B. Phukan first joined Jorhat District court then started practice in Gauhati High Court in 1962. He passed Assam Judicial Service in 1963. In 1970 he joined the Government of Meghalaya on deputation and became the Law Secretary and Legal Remembrancer in January 1976. He also served as part time lecturer in Shillong Law College as well as legal advisor of various corporations of the State. Phukan was elevated as Permanent Judge of the Gauhati High Court in 1985. On 30 September 1994 he was transferred to Himachal Pradesh High Court as acting Chief Justice. In 1996 he became the Chief Justice of Orissa High Court. Justice Phukan joined the Supreme Court of India as a Judge on 28 January 1999. He retired in 2002 from the judgeship. After a prolonged illness he died at age 81 on 11 November 2018.

References

1937 births
2018 deaths
People from Assam
Justices of the Supreme Court of India
Judges of the Gauhati High Court
Chief Justices of the Himachal Pradesh High Court
Chief Justices of the Orissa High Court
20th-century Indian judges
21st-century Indian judges